Sarmast is a city in Kermanshah Province, Iran.

Sarmast may also refer to:
 Sarmast, Hormozgan
 Sarmast, Kangavar, Kermanshah Province
 Sarmast, Kohgiluyeh and Boyer-Ahmad